Stempel is a surname. Notable people with the surname include:

 Gary Stempel (born 1957), English-Panamanian football manager 
 Herbert Stempel (1926-2020), television game show contestant who exposed the rigging of results in the 1950s quiz show Twenty One
 Robert Stempel (1933–2011), Chairman and CEO of General Motors

Fictional characters:
 Aaron Stempel, fictional character on the television show Here Come the Brides and the Star Trek novel Ishmael (as Aaron Stemple)

See also

 D Stempel AG type foundry
 Stempel Garamond typeface